Gibbula massieri is a species of sea snail, a marine gastropod mollusk in the family Trochidae, the top snails.

Description
The shell of G. massieri is conical with alternating brown and white chords. The size of the shell varies between 5 mm and 6.5 mm.

The head of the snail has three tentacles on each side.

Distribution
This species occurs in the Atlantic Ocean off Namibia.

References

External links
 To Encyclopedia of Life
 To World Register of Marine Species
 

massieri
Gastropods described in 2010